The Olănești is a right tributary of the river Olt in Romania. It discharges into the Olt in the city Râmnicu Vâlcea.

References

Rivers of Romania
Rivers of Vâlcea County